Magdalena Maleeva was the defending champion, but lost in the third round to Tamarine Tanasugarn.

Maria Sharapova won the title, defeating Tatiana Golovin in the final 4–6, 6–2, 6–1.

Seeds
The champion seed is indicated in bold text. Text in italics indicates the round in which that seed was eliminated. The top eight seeds received a bye to the second round.

  Nadia Petrova (second round)
  Patty Schnyder (semifinals)
  Maria Sharapova (champion)
  Magdalena Maleeva (third round)
  Jelena Dokić (second round)
  Nathalie Dechy (second round)
  Eleni Daniilidou (second round)
  Alicia Molik (quarterfinals)
  Émilie Loit (semifinals)
  María Vento-Kabchi (first round)
  Tina Pisnik (first round)
  Magüi Serna (first round)
  Claudine Schaul (first round)
  Lina Krasnoroutskaya (first round)
  Elena Likhovtseva (first round)
  María Sánchez Lorenzo (third round)

Draw

Finals

Top half

Section 1

Section 2

Bottom half

Section 3

Section 4

External links
 2004 DFS Classic draw 
 ITF tournament edition details

DFS Classic Singles
Singles